In electrical engineering, the alpha-beta transformation  (also known as the Clarke transformation) is a mathematical transformation employed to simplify the analysis of three-phase circuits. Conceptually it is similar to the dq0 transformation. One very useful application of the  transformation is the generation of the reference signal used for space vector modulation control of three-phase inverters.

History
In 1937 and 1938, Edith Clarke published papers with modified methods of calculations on unbalanced three-phase problems, that turned out to be particularly useful.

Definition

The  transform applied to three-phase currents, as used by Edith Clarke, is

The inverse transform is:

The above Clarke's transformation preserves the amplitude of the electrical variables which it is applied to. Indeed, consider a three-phase symmetric, direct, current sequence

Then, by applying  to the current sequence, it results

where the last equation holds since we have considered balanced currents. As it is shown in the above, the amplitudes of the currents in the  reference frame are the same of that in the natural reference frame.

Power invariant transformation 
The active and reactive powers computed in the Clarke's domain with the transformation shown above are not the same of those computed in the standard reference frame. This happens because  is not unitary. In order to preserve the active and reactive powers one has, instead, to consider

which is a unitary matrix and the inverse coincides with its transpose.
In this case the amplitudes of the transformed currents are not the same of those in the standard reference frame, that is

Finally, the inverse transformation in this case is

Simplified transformation 
Since in a balanced system  and thus  one can also consider the simplified transform

which is simply the original Clarke's transformation with the 3rd equation excluded, and

Geometric Interpretation

The  transformation can be thought of as the projection of the three phase quantities (voltages or currents) onto two stationary axes, the alpha axis and the beta axis.
If the system is not balanced, then the  term will contain the error component of the projection. This is the elegance of the clarke transform as it reduces a three component system into a two component system thanks to this assumption.

Another way to understand this is that the equation  defines a plane in a euclidean three coordinate space.

This also means that in order the use the Clarke transform, one must ensure the system is balanced, otherwise subsequent two coordinate calculations will be erroneous. This is a practical consideration in applications where the three phase quantities are measured and can possibly have measurement error.

dq0 transform

The  transform is conceptually similar to the  transform. Whereas the  transform is the projection of the phase quantities onto a rotating two-axis reference frame, the  transform can be thought of as the projection of the phase quantities onto a stationary two-axis reference frame.

See also
 Symmetrical components
 Y-Δ transform
 Field-oriented control

References

Electrical engineering
Three-phase AC power
 General references

 C.J. O'Rourke et al.  "A Geometric Interpretation of Reference Frames and Transformations: dq0, Clarke, and Park," in IEEE Transactions on Energy Conversion, vol. 34, no. 4, pp. 2070-2083, Dec. 2019.